In Hindu mythology, the Narayanastra is an astra, a celestial missile, affiliated to the Hindu deity, Vishnu, in his form of Narayana.

Description 
This astra ("celestial weapon" in Sanskrit) fires a volley of millions of deadly missiles simultaneously, the intensity of which rises in proportion to the resistance of the target. The only way to defend against the Narayanastra is, therefore, to show total submission before the missiles hit, which would cause them to stop and spare the target. It is one of the six 'Mantramukta' weapons that cannot be resisted. It was also said that it could be used only once in a war; if one tried to use it twice, it would devour the user's own army.

Literature

Mahabharata 

Ashvatthama, a warrior in the epic Mahabharata, came into the possession of the astra, and used it against the Pandava forces. When it was used, the Ekadasha (Eleven) Rudras appeared in the sky to destroy the Pandavas. Millions of weapons such as chakras, gadas, and ultra-sharp arrows appeared and moved to destroy them; all those who resisted were killed. Krishna, who knew how to stop the Narayanastra, advised the Pandavas and their army to immediately drop their weapons and utterly surrender to the great astra of Vishnu. 

When targeted, the Pandava Bhima refused to surrender, considering it an act of cowardice, and attacked the downpour of fiery arrows. The Narayana weapon concentrated its shower on him, and he gradually became exhausted. However, he was not killed, as Krishna and his brothers eventually restrained him. According to original text of Mahabharat written by Maharshi Ved Vyasa when Bhima refused to surrender to the great astra of Lord Vishnu to stop the Narayanastra. Then Krishna and Arjun began forcibly to take off all weapons from Bhima and to drag him down from his chariot.

Ramayana 
In the Ramayana, only Meghanada possessed this weapon. He used the weapon in his last fight against Lakshmana, but the astra refused to harm the latter, as he was an incarnation of Adishesha.

Bhagavata Purana 
Dhruva employs the astra during his invasion of Alaka, the realm of the yakshas:

Krishna employs the astra against Shiva in his quest to rescue Aniruddha from Banasura:

See also 

 Pashupatastra
 Indrastra
 Brahmastra

References

Weapons in Hindu mythology

Vaishnavism
Vishnu